Jadue is a Palestinian surname common in Chile. Notable people with the surname include:

Daniel Jadue (born 1967), Chilean politician, architect and sociologist
Matías Jadue (born 1992), Chilean-born Palestinian footballer
Sergio Jadue (born 1979), former president of the National Association of Professional Football of Chile
Soraya Jadué (born 1975), Chilean rower